Eva Činčerová (November 16, 1943 – January 31, 2005) was a Czech graphic designer, painter, and printmaker.

Life 
A native of Pelhřimov, Činčerová studied painting and graphic arts at the Academy of Fine Arts, Prague from 1962 until 1968; her instructor there was professor  and his assistant Ladislav Čepelák, who taught her graphic techniques. She devoted herself before all to the graphics techniques of etching and dry point in a large scale. Her human bodies were often designed in a life scale.  
For much of her career she was active in Prague and Jihlava.

Works 
 Cycles of graphics: Lonely people, Portraits 
 Book illustrations: Gustav Flaubert: Salambo (1980); Butterflies 
 Cartoons

Prize 
The city Jihlava awarded her its City Prize posthumously in 2009 for her lifetime achievements in the field of graphic art. She died in Bystřice nad Perštýnem. Činčerová is represented in the collection of the National Gallery of Art.

References

1943 births
2005 deaths
Czech women painters
Czech printmakers
Women printmakers
20th-century Czech painters
20th-century printmakers
20th-century Czech women artists
21st-century printmakers
21st-century Czech women artists
People from Pelhřimov
Academy of Fine Arts, Prague alumni